El espejismo brillaba is a Mexican telenovela produced by Ernesto Alonso for Telesistema Mexicano in 1966.

Cast 
Ofelia Guilmáin
 
Rafael Llamas
María Douglas
Juan Ferrara
Rosenda Monteros
Ada Carrasco
Malena Doria
Mario G. González
Angel Fernández
Lola Bravo
Mario García González

References

External links 

Mexican telenovelas
1966 telenovelas
Televisa telenovelas
Spanish-language telenovelas
1966 Mexican television series debuts
1966 Mexican television series endings